Tsa-Vedeno (Ċen Vedana)  is a rural locality (a selo) in Vedensky District, Chechnya.

Administrative and municipal status 
Municipally, Tsa-Vedeno is incorporated into Tsa-Vedenskoye rural settlement. It is the administrative center of the municipality and is one of the three settlements included in it.

Geography 

Tsa-Vedeno is located on the right bank of the Khulkhulau River.

The nearest settlements to Tsa-Vedeno are Khazhi-Yurt in the north-east, Agishbatoy in the south-east, Verkhny Tsa-Vedeno and Zelamkhin-Kotar in the south, Elistanzhi in the south-west, and Verkhatoy in the north-west.

History 
In 1944, after the genocide and deportation of the Chechen and Ingush people and the Chechen-Ingush ASSR was abolished, the village of Tsa-Vedeno was renamed to Makhach-Aul, and settled by people from the neighboring republic of Dagestan. From 1944 to 1957, it was a part of the Vedensky District of the Dagestan ASSR.

In 1958, after the Vaynakh people returned and the Chechen-Ingush ASSR was restored, the village regained its old Chechen name, Tsen Vedana.

Population 
 2002 Census: 1,478
 2010 Census: 1,285
 2019 estimate: ?

According to the 2010 Census, the majority of residents of Tsa-Vedeno were ethnic Chechens.

Infrastructure 
Tsa-Vedeno hosts two secondary schools.

References 

Rural localities in Vedensky District